Jiang Yi-huah (born 18 November 1960) is a Taiwanese politician and former Premier of the Republic of China (ROC). On 29 November 2014, he tendered his resignation and was succeeded by Mao Chi-kuo on 8 December 2014.

Prior to his appointment as the Premier, Jiang was the Vice Premier of the Republic of China from 2012 to 2013. He served as Minister of the Interior from 2009 to 2012 and Minister of Research, Development and Evaluation Commission of the Executive Yuan from 2008 to 2009.

Early life

Jiang was born into a Hakka family in Keelung, a city in northern Taiwan in 1960. During high school when he was 13, it was reported that he once wrote an essay saying that his dream career is to be the President of the Republic of China once he grow up.

He earned his bachelor's and master's degree in political science from National Taiwan University (NTU). He did his doctoral degree in political science from Yale University, United States in 1993. Upon graduation, he returned to Taiwan to become a professor  at NTU.

Research, Development and Evaluation Commission

Jiang entered politics for the very first time in 2008 when he was appointed as the Minister of Research, Development and Evaluation Commission of the Executive Yuan on 20 May 2008.

Taiwan sex workers decriminalization

During a press conference in June 2009, Jiang said that the Human Rights Protection and Promotion Committee of the Executive Yuan has decided to abolish Article 80 of the Social Order Maintenance Act which regulates sexual transaction that can cause detention or fining of the sex workers. However, the final decision will be left to the local governments.

Interior Ministry

On 10 September 2009, Jiang was appointed as Minister of the Interior (MOI). At the age of 49, he was the youngest person to ever hold the office. The handing over ceremony from the outgoing Minister Liao Liou-yi was presided by Premier Wu Den-yih in Taipei.

Uyghur activist ban on visiting Taiwan

Speaking at Legislative Yuan in October 2009, Jiang, accompanied by Premier Wu Den-yih, said that Uyghur activist Rebiya Kadeer should not be permitted to enter Taiwan because her World Uyghur Congress is closely associated with terrorist group. His remark was supported by the Premier.

Electoral system

In December 2009, Jiang said that officials from Ministry of the Interior and Ministry of Justice should ensure justice and fairness in administrative electoral process by avoiding stumping on the candidates. In March 2010, Jiang said that Taiwan will have seven kinds of local elections being held all in one day starting in 2014.

1996 Hotline for Interior Affairs

MOI officially launched the "1996 Hotline of Interior Affairs" in November 2011 after three months operation trial. Speaking at the press conference, Jiang said that the MOI is in charge of almost everything in people's daily life, ranging from marriage and birth registration, various social welfare and subsidies provider, petition service, corruption reporting, housing transfer registration and emergency reporting. In order to make their service more efficient and more convenient to people, MOI has merged some of their service hotline into one single number.

Vice Premiership

Jiang was appointed to become Vice Premier on 6 February 2012. With this, he had to resign from his professorship at NTU.

Immigration policy

In July 2012, Jiang said that the Executive Yuan is mulling immigration and population policy in order to attract foreign talents, boost human capital and improve Taiwan's competitiveness. He added that policies from various ministries will be integrated so that this regulation change won't affect much to the current local employment.

Premiership

Jiang was sworn in as the President of the Executive Yuan on 18 February 2013 at the Presidential Office in the ceremony presided over by Vice President Wu Den-yih, thus making him the Premier of the Republic of China. He was the youngest premier since Chen Cheng to take office. After the inauguration, Jiang pledged to push for government reform.

Jiang also wanted to meet with all opposition party leaders in near future upon his inauguration as Premier. He wishes to see a change in political culture and improve communication between the ruling party and opposition parties to have a more effective legislative.

Cross-strait relations

1992 consensus
In March 2013, Jiang reiterated his support to the 1992 Consensus policy of governing the relations between Taiwan and Mainland China that there is one China. However, he further explained that the KMT's point of view of one-China is that both sides maintain the status quo (no independence, no reunification, no use of force), not the immediate reunification. However, he is still not sure if Beijing allows Taiwan's interpretation of "One-China" as the "Republic of China".

Scottish independence referendum
In September 2014 ahead of independence referendum of Scotland from the United Kingdom, Jiang stated that there is no need for the ROC, as an independent nation, to hold an independence referendum. He denied that there was a similar comparison between Taiwan and Scottish referendum, adding that keeping the ROC as an independent and sovereign state is the top priority for the government to do.

Energy and environment

Nuclear power
Two weeks into his premiership in early March 2013, Jiang stated that he will tender his resignation from the Premier of the Republic of China if the nation votes to halt the construction of Taiwan's 4th nuclear power plant in the upcoming referendum due to the long ongoing debate of nuclear power plants in Taiwan. He even added that Taiwan will face energy crisis in the future once Taiwan's first and second nuclear power plant have reached the end of their life cycle respectively and the fourth plant hasn't been put online.

In mid-March 2013 speaking at the Legislative Yuan, Jiang said that all nuclear power plants in Taiwan will be decommissioned by 2055, including the currently constructed Longmen Nuclear Power Plant, based on their 40-year operating lifecycle.

In early April 2013, Jiang promised that he will remove the nuclear disposal area from its current place at Orchid Island in Taitung County once the new site has been identified, although no time table has been announced for the relocation. In the process of doing the job, Jiang will establish the relocation committee, considering name changing and cash compensation and investigating on any illegal activity in the decision making process.

Responding the offer from China National Nuclear Corporation to give land space for Taipower in storing the radioactive waste in Gansu province, Jiang said that he had no information regarding to the matters and said that it will not be politically feasible. He further added that even the Executive Yuan cannot make the decision unilaterally.

In mid April 2013, Jiang toured the 4th nuclear power plant in Gongliao, New Taipei. He made a contradicting remark saying that referendum to decide the fate of the nuclear plant is not needed if the safety issues of the plant cannot be guaranteed, because the government would not issue the operating license once it has been completed.

Water supply
In March 2013, commenting on the increasing of water scarcity in Taiwan, Jiang said that he hoped that this year typhoon will come early to bring rains and thus more water to the drought-hit regions in the island. The rainfall in Taiwan in the first quarter of 2013 hasn't been that good because two rainfall catchment areas, the Shihmen Dam and Zengwun Dam, hit their second lowest and lowest marks respectively. His government also have prepared some contingency plan to deal with this water shortage problem, such as reducing water consumption, rationing water for irrigation and controlling water used for car wash and swimming pools.

Another response to water shortage in Taiwan, Jiang also instructed the Ministry of the Interior to conduct a study on the possibility of reusing water from the treated waste water at the waste water treatment plant as another alternative water resource.

Household water sewage treatment
In March 2013, Jiang reassured the government's 3% annual increase of sewage drainage rate for houses in Taiwan. He urged government officials to maintain the goal target.

Economy

Taiwan's Q1 2013 economic growth
Commenting on Taiwan's Q1 2013 lower-than-expected 1.54% economic growth in end of April 2013, Jiang said that the low figure was due to the lack of consumer spending, slow export rates and the gloomy global economic situation. However, he looked forward to speed up the launching of free economic zones around Taiwan and creating emerging markets. He also plan to push the Taoyuan Aerotropolis project. He promised that the government will continue to implement measures to boost Taiwan's GDP over 3% for 2013.

Minimum wage hike
In end of April 2013, Jiang reassured that the minimum wage hike will keep going on starting 1 April 2013 based on what had been announced before from NT$18,780 to NT$19,047, despite Taiwan's lower-than-forecast economic growth in Q1 2013, which stood at 1.54%, a 1.72% lower than the initial forecast at 3.26%.

Taoyuan International Airport MRT delay
Speaking at the Executive Yuan in early May 2013 regarding Taoyuan International Airport MRT construction delay, Jiang said that the delay has hampered the development of Taiwan and eroded public confidence and trust in the government. He urge all of the government agencies to learn from this mistake and not to repeat the same thing again in the future. He suggested that the cabinet to establish a task force to supervise the status of major construction projects being undertaken by government agencies.

Taiwan's 2013 global competitiveness ranking decline
Commenting on Taiwan's 2013 global competitiveness ranking decline by the International Institute for Management Development in end of May 2013, Jiang ask all of the government sectors to make improvements and address the relevant problems. He added that economic stimulus have been implemented last year, but the questions remain on whether the government can fully implement them.

Disaster and crisis management

Nantou earthquake
After a 6.0 Richter-scale earthquake strike with the epicenter in Nantou County on 27 March 2013, Jiang initiated a cabinet emergency task force to work with the relevant agencies to respond to the earthquake situation. He also urged the relevant government agencies to reassess the safety standards for any local infrastructure building.

2013 Korean crisis
Amid the rising tension in the Korean Peninsula in April 2013, Jiang said that the government has been paying a very close attention to any latest development in the situation. The Ministry of Foreign Affairs has also been in close communication with the Taipei Mission in Korea in Seoul and its Busan branch in South Korea, he added.

Jiang further explained that the government has prepared contingency plans responding to the current situation. Ministry of Economic Affairs will provide the information about economic situation in South Korea to the Taiwanese business people and general assistance. The Financial Supervisory Commission will carry out measures to maintain the stability of Taiwan's capital market. The Ministry of National Defense will also be standby to provide any assistance.

2013 H7N9 flu virus outbreak
After Taiwan's first confirmed H7N9 flu case on 24 April, the first outside Mainland China, Jiang gathered officials from Department of Health, Ministry of Transportation and Communications and Council of Agriculture to discuss responsive measures to this outbreak. He said that the government would bring forward the ban on slaughtering fowls in traditional markets to mid of June by asking the Council of Agriculture to communicate with the slaughterhouses around Taiwan.

Taiwanese fisherman shooting incident

After the shooting incident of Taiwanese fisherman by Philippine government vessel on 9 May 2013 at the disputed water in South China Sea, Jiang asked the Executive Yuan to hold a meeting in which he then instructed the cabinet members to negotiate with the government of Philippines.

Politics

Detention of Chen Shui-bian
In April 2013, responding to the remark from the DPP legislator, Jiang reaffirmed that the detention of former President Chen Shui-bian in Taipei Prison is not politically motivated, but purely because of his corruption crime.

Corruption fight
In early May 2013, Jiang said that he hates corruption and wish to have all of his Executive Yuan officials free from such involvement. He requested Justice Minister Tseng Yung-fu to look into any unsuitable officials for their position. He requested not only the heads of government to maintain their integrity, but also all of the other officials working under them. The move came after several corruption cases involving Cabinet Secretary-General Lin Yi-shih and Kuomintang Taipei City Councilor Lai Su-ju.

See also

 List of premiers of the Republic of China

References

|-

|-

1960 births
Living people
Kuomintang politicians in Taiwan
Taiwanese Ministers of the Interior
Politicians of the Republic of China on Taiwan from Keelung
Premiers of the Republic of China on Taiwan
National Taiwan University alumni
Academic staff of the National Taiwan University
Yale University alumni
Taiwanese politicians of Hakka descent
Academic staff of the National Chung Cheng University